is an illustrated guide describing famous places, called meisho, and depicting their scenery in pre-1868 Owari province in central Japan. It was printed using Japanese woodblock printing techniques in books divided among volumes.

The Owari meisho Zue followed the publication of the Edo meisho zue, which sparked a public interest in travel guides.

External links 

Edo-period works
History of Nagoya
Japanese books
Owari Province
Travel guide books
Ukiyo-e
Japanese non-fiction books